J. Scott Angle (born January 6, 1953) is the University of Florida's Vice President for Agriculture and Natural Resources and leader of UF's Institute of Food and Agricultural Sciences.

Angle is a national leader in developing the science that supports food production and management of natural resources. As chief executive of the agriculture and environmental sciences arm of a leading land-grant university, he champions public science as a path to improve lives and reduce human suffering.

Early life and education 
Angle was born in Michigan and grew up in Baltimore, Maryland. Angle received his Bachelor of Science degree in Agronomy and Master of Science in soil science from the University of Maryland. After university, Angle was a Fulbright fellow, and worked at Rothamsted Research in the United Kingdom. He later earned a Ph.D. in soil microbiology from the University of Missouri.

Career 
Angle worked for 24 years as a professor of soil science and as administrator of the Maryland Agricultural Experiment Station and Maryland Cooperative Extension.

From 2005 to 2015, Angle lived in Athens, Georgia, and served as director of the College of Agricultural and Environmental Sciences at the University of Georgia. After leaving the university, Angle worked as president and CEO of the International Fertilizer Development Center. He has authored more than 300 scientific publications. He holds seven patents.

Angle is a fellow in the American Society of Agronomy and the Soil Science Society of America.

Director of the National Institute of Food and Agriculture 
In September 2018, President Donald Trump nominated Angle to a six-year term as the third Director of the National Institute of Food and Agriculture. He was sworn into office on October 29, 2018, by United States Secretary of Agriculture Sonny Perdue.

In 2019, Angle was chosen as the Spring Commencement Speaker for his alma mater, the University of Maryland College of Agriculture and Natural Resources. In October 2020, Angle was honored by his other alma mater with the Distinguished Alumni Award for the University of Missouri's College of Agriculture, Food and Natural Resources.

Leader of the University of Florida Institute of Food and Agricultural Sciences 
In July 2020, Angle became the University of Florida's vice president for agriculture and natural resources and administrative head of the UF Institute of Food and Agricultural Sciences.

References

External links 
 Biography at U.S. Department of Agriculture

Living people
University of Maryland, College Park alumni
American microbiologists
American soil scientists
University of Missouri alumni
Trump administration personnel
United States Department of Agriculture officials
1953 births